The 1930 United States Senate election in Iowa took place on November 4, 1930. Incumbent Democratic Senator Daniel F. Steck ran for re-election to a full term in office, but was defeated by U.S. Representative Lester J. Dickinson.

This was the only Senate seat Republicans gained in the 1930 elections.

General election

Candidates
Lester J. Dickinson, U.S. Representative from Algona (Republican)
L.E. Eickelberg, candidate for Senate in 1924 (Independent)
Daniel F. Steck, incumbent Senator since 1926 (Democratic)
Arthur A. Wells (Farmer-Labor)

Results

See also 
 1930 United States Senate elections

References 

1930
Iowa
United States Senate